Sarah Legrain (born 17 November 1985) is a French teacher and politician. A member of La France Insoumise (FI), she was elected to represent the 16th constituency of Paris in the National Assembly in the first round of the 2022 legislative election.

References 

1985 births
Living people
21st-century French educators
Educators from Paris
21st-century French women politicians
Politicians from Île-de-France
Deputies of the 16th National Assembly of the French Fifth Republic
La France Insoumise politicians
Women members of the National Assembly (France)
Members of Parliament for Paris
École Normale Supérieure alumni